Pryma is a surname. Notable people with the surname include:

 Artem Pryma (born 1987), Ukrainian biathlete
 Dmytro Pryma (born 1985), Ukrainian footballer
 Roma Pryma-Bohachevsky (1927–2004), Ukrainian ballerina
 Roman Pryma (born 1981), Ukrainian biathlete

See also
 

Ukrainian-language surnames